I'll Never Love Anyone Anymore with the Japanese title “Mou Daremo Aisanai” (もう誰も愛さない) is a 1991 Japanese TV drama broadcast every Thursday from April 11 – June 27 from 10:00pm to 10:54pm on Fuji TV’s “Thursday Theatre” programming format.  It was directed by Yasuyuki Kusada, Hiroshi Akabane and Satoru Nakajima. Eisaku Yoshida plays the lead character.

The 12 episode TV drama began rebroadcasting on October 8, 2019 on TVK (Television Kanagawa), a local Japanese station located in Kanagawa, in the Greater Tokyo Area.

The 12 episode series rebroadcast in 2019.

Cast 
 Eisaku Yoshida
 Minako Tanaka
 Tomoko Yamaguchi
Arisa Mizuki
Takuro Tatsumi
Reiko Kato
Kazue Ito
Noboru Nakaya
Masato Ibu
Tomoko Yamaguchi

Production 

 Planning- Akifumi Takuma , Kenji Shimizu
 Screenplay - Masahiro Yoshimoto , Zhongshan 乃莉 Ko , Masato Hayashi
 Composer - Daisuke Iwasaki
 Director- Yasuyuki Kusuda , Hiroshi Akabane , Satoru Nakajima
 Theme Song - Billie Hughes "Welcome to the Edge ("Todokanu Omoi” とどかぬ想い (One-Sided Love))"
 Insert Song - Randy Crawford  "Almaz known as "Sweet Love"

In the announcement after the end of the 9th episode and the 10th episode, Mie Yamamoto 's "Sweet Love" (Japanese cover of the inserted song), and in the announcement after the 10th episode, BON CHIC 's "Don't Feel" (Japanese cover of the theme song, "Welcome to the Edge ("Todokanu Omoi” とどかぬ想い (One-Sided Love))"") was used.

 Technical cooperation- Higashidori , Shibuya Video Studio
 Art cooperation- Fuji Art
 Producers - Yuzo Abe , Toyohiko Wada
 Production - Fuji TV, AVEC

Overview 
The crime series was named “Roller Coaster Drama” because of the quick progression of the story and the unpredictable element of suspense. The concept and drama was so popular that the same creative team produced "I can't see only you" (1992) and "I can't show tears anymore" (1993), making "Mou Daremo Aisainai" (もう誰も愛さない) the first of the "Roller Coaster Drama trilogy". “Roller Coaster Drama” became known as a genre.

References

External links 
 http://www.tvdrama-db.com/drama_info/p/id-27298

Japanese drama television series
Japanese crime television series
Television series about revenge
1991 in Japanese television
1991 Japanese television series debuts
Fuji TV dramas
Fuji TV original programming